"This Will Be" is a song written by Chuck Jackson and Marvin Yancy, arranged 
by Richard Evans and performed by American singer Natalie Cole. Often appended with "(An Everlasting Love)" but not released as such, this was Cole's debut single, released in April 1975 and one of her biggest hits, becoming a number-one R&B and number-six pop smash in the United States, also reaching the UK Top 40. Cole won a Grammy Award for Best Female R&B Vocal Performance, a category that had previously been dominated by Aretha Franklin. It would also help her win the Grammy Award for Best New Artist.

Cole had been turned down by every label she approached, but finally gained the interest of Larkin Arnold, who at the time was the executive of Capitol Records, through demos produced by Jackson and Yancy. The two wrote the song at the end of sessions for Arnold, just as he and Cole were about to leave town.

In popular culture 
The song has featured in several films:

 While You Were Sleeping (1995)
 The Parent Trap (1998) (end title) 
 A Cinderella Story (2004)
 Taxi (2004)

In 2012 the song was also used in the "Lip Sync for Your Life" segment of the third episode of the fourth season of the reality competition series RuPaul's Drag Race, which also featured Cole as a guest judge. Contestant DiDa Ritz's performance of the song has since been acclaimed as one of the best in the show's history and received admiration from Cole herself.

Charts

Weekly charts

Year-end charts

Certifications

References

External links
 [ Song review] on AllMusic

1975 songs
1975 debut singles
Natalie Cole songs
Pop ballads
Songs written by Marvin Yancy
Capitol Records singles